The Kind + Jugend Innovation Award is a German design award granted annually to the best overall baby product in the areas of design, safety, user-friendliness, degree of innovation, and quality of workmanship. Particular emphasis is placed on innovation and safety, with past winners displaying unique designs and new technology.

History
Held annually in Cologne, Germany, the Kind + Jugend trade fair has made a name for itself as the leading international fair for infants' and children's products, including carriages, car seats, and fashion. The fair attracts more than seven hundred exhibitors and sixteen thousand visitors. In 2005, the first Innovation Award was presented.

Selections are made by a jury in the weeks leading up to the trade show. The jury is composed of leading experts in infant health and safety and representatives from applicable international trade magazines.

Categories
The products are separated into five categories, and there is one winner in each.
 
World of Mobile Baby: includes baby carriages and accessories
World of Baby Safety: includes safety seats and accessories
World of Baby Furniture & Textiles: includes children’s furniture, textile outfitting and accessories
World of Baby Care: includes hygiene products, electric appliances and accessories
World of Baby Toys: includes toys for babies and small children

Recipients

2005 winners
Mobile Baby: Xplory (Stokke, Stroller)
Baby Safety: Cybex Solution (Cybex Europe, Car seat)
Baby Furniture & Textiles: (Roba Baumann, Expandable Children’s Bed)
Baby Care: Reer Bevetel (Babyphone)
Baby Toys: Symphony Light & Motion (Tiny Love, Mobile)

2006 winners
Mobile Baby: ENGLACHA (Prokids International, Pram)
Baby Safety: CYBEX ZERONE (CYBEX Industrial Ltd., Child Safety Seat)
Baby Furniture & Textiles: Fresco Bloom (Bloom, High chair)
Baby Care: Cool Twister (Nuernberg Gummi GmbH & Co., “ensures baby food is served at precisely the right temperature”)
Baby Toys: MoOB (Maitz Products KEG, Modular Mobility Unit)

2007 winners
Mobile Baby: Skate (Peg Perego, Stroller)
Baby Safety: ROMER KING plus (BRITAX ROMER, Child Safety Seat)
Baby Furniture & Textiles: hoppop (BabyArt, Nursery Seat)
Baby Care: Shampoo Rinse Cup (TrendyKid Ltd.)
Baby Toys: Shop & Play 2-in-1 Activity Centre (Infantino UK)

2008 winners
World of Baby Toys: Tessell (IWASHIN DESIGN South Korea)

2009 winners
World of Moving Baby: kobi (mima push-chair)
World of Travelling Baby: Maxi-Cosi Car Seat Family (Dorel Netherlands)
World of Moving Baby and Travelling Baby Accessories: Lolaloo (Lolaloo GmbH)
World of Baby Safety at Home: Slamjam (BDI Inventions Ltd/Askopa
World of Baby Toys: Kiditec (Techno Bloxx AG)
World of Baby Textiles: Wetpets (Wetpets GbR)
World of Baby Care: Babybath with removable bath ring (TIGEX)
World of Baby Furniture: alma urban cot/crib by bloom (Bloom baby)

References

External links
 Kind + Jugend Trade Show Official Site
 "Kind + Jugend Sets the Trends"
 "Strong Interest in Kind + Jugend 2005 among North American Companies"

Design awards
German awards
German design
Awards established in 2005